A list of all windmills and windmill sites which lie in the current ceremonial county of Bedfordshire.


Locations

Locations formerly within Bedfordshire

For windmills in Eaton Socon see List of windmills in Cambridgeshire.

Sources

Unless stated otherwise, the source for all entries is

Maps

1765 Thomas Jeffrey

Notes

Mills in bold are still standing, known building dates are indicated in bold. Text in italics denotes indicates that the information is not confirmed, but is likely to be the case stated.

References

 
Bedfordshire
Windmills